Hugh Farrington (June 9, 1931 - August 7, 2001) was an American actor best known for his recurring role as Detective Lieutenant Pete O'Brien on the television series T. J. Hooker. Farrington was injured while serving as an aviator in the United States Navy and acted while using a wheelchair.

Farrington was also known for such films and television series The Terminator, Arizona Heat, Caged Fury, Quincy, M.E., Airwolf, The Golden Girls and Coming Home.

Filmography

References

External links

American male television actors
American male film actors
American male stage actors
American people with disabilities
United States Navy
American aviators
Place of birth missing
1931 births
2001 deaths
20th-century American male actors